
The League of Left-Wing Writers, commonly abbreviated as the Zuolian in Chinese, was an organization of writers formed in Shanghai, China, on 2 March 1930, at the instigation of the Chinese Communist Party and the influence of the celebrated author Lu Xun. 

Other members included Ding Ling, Hu Feng, and Mei Zhi. The purpose of the League was to promote socialist realism in support of the Communist Revolution, and it eventually became very influential in Chinese cultural circles. Lu Xun delivered the opening address to the organizational meeting, but he became disillusioned when it quickly became clear that he would have little influence. Other members included leaders of the Sun Society and the Creation Society, and Zhou Yang, who became Mao Zedong's favorite literary figure and after 1949 zealously enforced  political orthodoxy. The League articulated theories on the political role of literature that foreshadowed Mao's influential Yan'an Talks on Literature and Art, and engaged in running debates with the "art for art's sake" Crescent Moon Society.

Due to the League's prominent political views, it was quickly banned by the Kuomintang government. On 7 February 1931, the government executed five members of the League: Li Weisen (李伟森), Hu Yepin, Rou Shi, Yin Fu (殷夫), and Feng Keng.

The League was disbanded voluntarily in 1936. This was mainly in order to encourage authors to unite across political boundaries and face the rapidly increasing threat from Japan.

Execution
Five Chinese writers associated with the League of Left-Wing Writers  Li Weisen, Hu Yepin, Rou Shi, Yin Fu, and Feng Keng  were executed on 7 February 1931 by the Kuomintang in the "White Terror" period that followed the 1927 Shanghai massacre.

Eighteen other communists were executed on the same day, including a pregnant woman.

Some have suggested that the five may have been betrayed by others in the Communist Party, perhaps as a result of a power struggle.

Notes

References

See also 
Union of Soviet Writers
Union of Chinese Writers
League of American Writers

Chinese literature
Organizations based in Shanghai
1930 establishments in China
Arts organizations established in 1930
Culture in Shanghai
Modern Chinese poetry
1936 disestablishments in China
Organizations disestablished in 1936